Lytta stygica is a species of blister beetle in the family Meloidae. It is found in North America.

References

Further reading

 
 

Meloidae
Articles created by Qbugbot
Beetles described in 1851